Adliya (Arabic: العدلية) is the bohemian neighborhood in Manama, Bahrain.

Overview
The district is a multicultural, busy area, a home to commerce, culture and entertainment, and it is considered one of the four centres of Manama's nightlife. In the last few years, many of the old townhouses have been turned into art galleries, cafes and chic restaurants, causing some analysts to term the area as being bourgeois.

As a result of the developing trend, Adliya is known for its clustered cafes, art galleries, bars, pubs, clubs and restaurants, including popular venues, such as BJ's, JJ's, Lilou's, The Meat Co. and Candle's. Adliya attracts many local residents and tourists alike.

Galleries
The district is the heartland of art galleries in Bahrain. Notable galleries in the area include the Albareh art gallery, Al Riwaq art gallery, Kalabhavan Bahrain institute amongst others.

See also
 List of tourist attractions in Bahrain
 Culture of Bahrain

References

External links
 A bit about life in Adliya, A westerner's perspective of living in Adliya

Neighborhoods of Manama
Art gallery districts